Didier Kamanzi, is a Rwandan actor. One of the most popular actors in Rwandan cinema, Kamanzi is best known for the roles in the films Rwasa, Rwassibo and Catherine.

Apart from acting, he is also a player in the Rwanda national rugby union team.

Personal life
He was born in 1994 in Burundi as the third child of a family with six siblings. After the Rwanda genocide, he returned to Rwanda in 1994 and attended high school. He worked as a bouncer for a local night club for few months.

Career
While he work as a bouncer in the night club, he got an offer to audition for a film. He went to the audition and he got the role.

In 2015, he won the award for the Best actor at the Rwandan movie awards.

Partial filmography

References

External links
 

Rwandan male actors
Living people
1994 births